Neelam Pol (born 1981) is an entrepreneur and founder of Khel Planet Foundation. She is a Harvard University alumna and lives in Mumbai.

Personal life
Pol was born with right arm phocomelia, a permanent, non-progressive, physical disability in which right arm was shorter than the left.

Education 
Pol attained a master's degree in International Education Policy from the Harvard University Graduate School of Education. She completed her MBA in Strategy Management from Indian Institute of Technology, Kharagpur. She is an engineering graduate in Computer Science & Technology from Shreemati Nathibai Damodar Thackersey Women's University.

She has been a World Bank Scholar and Vital Voices Fellow. She was also awarded the Education Entrepreneurship Fellowship in 2014 by Harvard University.

Career
Pol started her career working at Infosys as a software engineer. She later worked at companies including IBM and Tech Mahindra, where she worked in business sales, marketing and operations manager before becoming an educationist.

She left corporate career in 2012, and spent time working at the grass root level in rural India with government schools and focused on school leadership.

In 2014, Pol co-founded the non-profit organization Khel Planet Foundation, which aims to help children develop their full potential. In 2015, Neelam was selected among the top social entrepreneurs to attend Social Entrepreneurs Forum in Sweden organized by SE Forum.

She is a Programme Specialist, Innovation with UNICEF India. In past she has even worked as Education Consultant at The World Bank where she was leading the on-ground implementation support for Government of Bihar's enhancing teachers' effectiveness project. She has also been an innovation and policy consultant to Government of Maharashtra, as part of RUSA program, working towards improving higher education in the State.

Pol is a practitioner of adaptive leadership and has been a leadership mentor to group of young graduates to help them become social change agents of tomorrow. She has spoken to various events and colleges.

References 

Living people
IIT Kharagpur alumni
Harvard Graduate School of Education alumni
SNDT Women's University alumni
20th-century Indian educators
UNICEF people
World Bank people
Indian people with disabilities
1981 births